Brent Stuart Lillibridge (born September 18, 1983) is an American former professional baseball  utility player. He played in Major League Baseball (MLB) for the Atlanta Braves, Chicago White Sox, Boston Red Sox, Cleveland Indians, Chicago Cubs and New York Yankees. He was known for his versatile playing skills and defensive prowess in the outfield. As a utility player, he started at every position except pitcher and catcher in his career.

Amateur career
Lillibridge attended Henry M. Jackson High School in Mill Creek, Washington.

Lillibridge played for the Washington Huskies baseball program for three seasons, where he was named to the All-Pac-10 Conference Team for three straight seasons. In 2004, he played collegiate summer baseball with the Harwich Mariners of the Cape Cod Baseball League.

Professional career

Pittsburgh Pirates
The Pittsburgh Pirates selected Lillibridge in the fourth round, with the 121st overall selection, of the 2005 MLB draft.

Atlanta Braves
On January 17, 2007, the Pirates traded Lillibridge with Mike Gonzalez to the Atlanta Braves for Adam LaRoche and Jamie Romak.

Lillibridge began the  season in Triple-A for the Richmond Braves. He played 19 games and batted .195 with one home run before his contract was purchased on April 26, 2008. He made his major league debut on that same day against the New York Mets and had four at bats and struck out three times.  He doubled for his first major league hit on June 25, 2008 at Toronto.

On July 12, 2008 in a game against the San Diego Padres at Petco Park, Lillibridge hit his first major league home run against relief pitcher Joe Thatcher.

Chicago White Sox
On December 4, 2008, the Braves traded Lillibridge, Tyler Flowers, Jon Gilmore, and Santos Rodriguez to the Chicago White Sox for Javier Vázquez and Boone Logan.

On April 11, 2011, Lillibridge hit a fifth-inning home run off Dallas Braden. It was the 10,000th home run hit in the 112-year history of White Sox baseball.

Lillibridge garnered media coverage after he made two back-to-back, game-saving and game-ending defensive catches while playing right field on April 26, 2011. The catches comprised the two final outs of a game played against the New York Yankees in Yankee Stadium and resulted in the White Sox getting the victory.

Boston Red Sox
On June 24, 2012, Lillibridge was traded to the Boston Red Sox with Zach Stewart for Kevin Youkilis and cash. The Red Sox designated him for assignment on July 16.

Cleveland Indians
Lillibridge was traded by Boston to the Cleveland Indians on July 24, for minor league pitcher José De La Torre. On November 20, 2012, Lillibridge was assigned outright to the Indians Triple-A affiliate Columbus Clippers. Lillibridge declined the assignment to Columbus and was granted free agency on November 26.

Chicago Cubs

On January 10, 2013, Lillibridge signed a minor league contract with the Chicago Cubs. On March 31, the Cubs added Lillibridge to their major league active roster. He was designated for assignment on April 16, 2013. On April 19, Lillibridge cleared waivers, and was assigned to the Triple-A Iowa Cubs of the Pacific Coast League.

New York Yankees
On June 21, 2013, Lillibridge was traded to the New York Yankees for cash considerations. The Yankees promoted Lillibridge to the major leagues when they placed Derek Jeter on the disabled list on July 19. He was designated for assignment to make room for the activation of Alex Rodriguez on August 5. He was outrighted from the 40-man roster and optioned to Triple-A on August 9. He declared free agency on October 1.

Texas Rangers
Lillibridge signed a minor league deal with the Texas Rangers on December 12, 2013. He was assigned to the minor league camp on March 22, 2014 failing to make the Rangers' opening day roster. He became a free agent after the 2014 season and had chosen to retire by the start of the 2015 season.

Personal life
Lillibridge is married to Stephanie, with whom he has three children. Lillibridge is a Christian, and his invitation to baseball player Steven Souza to attend church with him led to Souza becoming baptized.

References

External links

 

1983 births
Living people
Atlanta Braves players
Baseball players at the 2003 Pan American Games
Baseball players from Washington (state)
Boston Red Sox players
Charlotte Knights players
Chicago Cubs players
Chicago White Sox players
Cleveland Indians players
Harwich Mariners players
Hickory Crawdads players
Iowa Cubs players
Lynchburg Hillcats players
Major League Baseball shortstops
Mississippi Braves players
New York Yankees players
Pan American Games medalists in baseball
Pan American Games silver medalists for the United States
Richmond Braves players
Round Rock Express players
Scranton/Wilkes-Barre RailRiders players
Sportspeople from Everett, Washington
United States national baseball team players
Washington Huskies baseball players
Williamsport Crosscutters players
Medalists at the 2003 Pan American Games